This is a list of town tramway systems in France by région. It includes all tram systems, past and present. Cities with currently operating systems, and those systems themselves, are indicated in bold and blue background colored rows. Those tram systems that operated on other than standard gauge track (where known) are indicated in the 'Notes' column.

Auvergne-Rhône-Alpes

Bourgogne-Franche-Comté

Brittany (Bretagne)

Centre-Val de Loire

Corsica (Corse)

Grand Est

Hauts-de-France

Île-de-France

Normandie

Nouvelle-Aquitaine

Occitanie

Pays de la Loire

Provence-Alpes-Côte d'Azur

See also 
 Trams in France
 List of town tramway systems in Europe
 List of tram and light rail transit systems
 List of metro systems
 List of trolleybus systems in France

References

Inline citations

Bibliography 

 

Sources, references and external links:
 Books, Periodicals and External Links

Tramway systems
France